Fazel Baig is a neighborhood in Kabul city's west. It is a populated area of the city which lies beside the Kabul-Kandahar highway.

See also 
 Neighborhoods of Kabul

References

Neighborhoods of Kabul